Saurorhynchus (= Acidorhynchus) is an extinct genus of carnivorous bony fish. It is the youngest representative of the family Saurichthyidae and the order Saurichthyiformes. This family is known for its large, elongate jaws, similar to modern Belonidae. Saurichthyidae also includes the Permian genus Eosaurichthys and the Triassic genus Saurichthys.

Fossils of Saurorhynchus have been found in Europe (France, Belgium, Luxembourg, United Kingdom, Germany, Italy) and North America (Canada). It lived during the Early and Middle Jurassic epochs. It is commonly found in pelagic and lagoonal deposits, but mostly marine. Four species are recognized.

The Late Triassic species Saurichthys striolatus, Saurichthys calcaratus, and Saurichthys deperditus are sometimes referred to Saurorhynchus, although Saurorhynchus is then treated as a subgenus of Saurichthys.

See also

 Prehistoric fish
 List of prehistoric bony fish

References 

Prehistoric bony fish genera
Early Jurassic fish
Jurassic fish of Europe
Jurassic bony fish
Prehistoric ray-finned fish genera
Saurichthyiformes